Cheshmeh Zeytun (also Romanized as Cheshmeh Zeytūn) is a village in Sornabad Rural District, Hamaijan District, Sepidan County, Fars Province, Iran. At the 2006 census, its population was 85, in 26 families.

References 

Populated places in Sepidan County